Sizwe is a village in Burma. Sizwe may also refer to
Sizwe (given name)
Sizwe Banzi Is Dead, a 1972 play by Athol Fugard
Umkhonto we Sizwe (Spear of the Nation), armed wing of the African National Congress
Umkhonto we Sizwe (Spear of the Nation), a 1984 reggae album by Prince Far I